HMS Rattlesnake was a unique design of torpedo gunboat of the Royal Navy. A result of the Russian war scare of 1885, she was designed by Nathaniel Barnaby that year and built by Laird Brothers, of Birkenhead. Quickly made obsolete by the new torpedo boat destroyers, she became an experimental submarine target ship in 1906, and was sold in 1910.

Design
Designed by Nathaniel Barnaby in 1885, Rattlesnake was, like the larger torpedo cruisers and the s, built in response to the Russian War scare. They were intended as a form of gunboat armed with torpedoes and designed for hunting and destroying smaller torpedo boats. By the end of the 1890s torpedo gunboats were superseded by their more successful contemporaries, the torpedo boat destroyers, and this quickly made Rattlesnake and her follow-on classes, the s, s, s and s, obsolete.

Built of steel, Rattlesnake was un-armoured with the exception of a -inch protective deck. She was armed with a single 4-inch/25-pounder breech-loading gun, six 3-pounder QF guns and four  torpedo tubes, arranged with two fixed tubes at the bow and a set of torpedo dropping carriages on either side. Four torpedo reloads were carried.

Propulsion was provided by two sets of Laird Brothers vertical triple-expansion steam engines, making her the first vessel in the Royal Navy to have such efficient engines.

Construction
Rattlesnake was laid down at Laird Brothers' Birkenhead yard as yard number 537 on 16 November 1885. She was launched on 11 September 1886, at a total cost of £21,425 for the hull and £14,000 for her machinery. She was commissioned for the first time in May 1887.

Service history

Rattlesnake took part in the 1893 British Naval Manoeuvres in the Irish Sea in late July–early August that year. Torpedo gunboats proved ineffective during the manoeuvres, although Rattlesnake was one of the few torpedo gunboats that were considered capable of fulfilling the role of opposing enemy torpedo boats. During the manoeuvres, Rattlesnake claimed three torpedo boats of the opposing force "sunk" although the exercise referees only awarded one of the claims. She was present on 26 June 1897 at the Naval Review at Spithead in celebration of Queen Victoria's Diamond Jubilee. She became an experimental submarine target ship in 1906, and was sold in 1910.

See also
List of gunboat and gunvessel classes of the Royal Navy

Notes

References

 

 
 

Torpedo boats of the Royal Navy
Ships built on the River Mersey
1886 ships
War scare